Heinrich "Harry" Haerendel (1886–1991) was a Hamburg born German artist. His most widely known work is his Der alte Seebär (lit. "The Old Sea Bear", also known in Scandinavia as Fiskargubben, "The Old Fisherman") picturing a bearded old sailor with a pensive countenance in a sou'wester smoking a pipe. It has been claimed that rather than being a fisherman it is a picture of the Dutch lifeboatman Dorus Rijkers. Prints of this work were very popular in the mid to late 20th century in Scandinavia and has been described as a noted example of kitsch art.

References

1886 births
1991 deaths
20th-century German painters
20th-century German male artists
Artists from Hamburg
Men centenarians
German centenarians